Sorimachi (written: 反町) is a Japanese surname. Notable people with the surname include:

, Japanese footballer
, Japanese actor and singer
, Japanese footballer and manager

Japanese-language surnames